The 1891–92 season was the tenth season in the history of Burnley Football Club and their fourth in The Football League. It was, up to that point, their most successful League season as the team finished in seventh place, with a record of 11 wins, 4 draws and 11 defeats. The top goalscorer was Scottish forward Tom Nicol, who scored 18 goals in 27 league and cup matches, while fellow Scot Alexander McLardie was the runner-up with 10 goals.

Football League

Match results

Final league position

FA Cup

Lancashire Senior Cup

Player statistics
Key to positions

CF = Centre forward
FB = Fullback
GK = Goalkeeper

HB = Half-back
IF = Inside forward
OF = Outside forward

Statistics

References

Burnley F.C. seasons
Burnley